Liao Xilong (born June 1940) is a retired general in the People's Liberation Army.

Biography
Liao was born in Sinan, Guizhou Province. He enlisted in the People's Liberation Army (PLA) in January 1959, and joined the Communist Party of China (CPC) in February 1963. He graduated from the Basic Department of the Military Academy of the PLA in 1981.

He was elevated to the deputy commander of the Chengdu Military Region in 1985. He spent months studying national defense at PLA National Defense University in 1986. He was promoted to the position of commander of the Chengdu Military Region and the vice Party secretary there in 1995. From 1999 to 2001, he took graduate classes in Sociology at Peking University. In 2002, he was appointed the director of the General Logistics Department of the PLA and a member of the Central Military Commission of the Party, and a year later, of the state.

Liao was a member of the 15th, 16th and 17th Central Committees of the Communist Party of China.

References 

1940 births
Living people
People from Tongren
People's Liberation Army generals from Guizhou
Members of the 15th Central Committee of the Chinese Communist Party
Members of the 16th Central Committee of the Chinese Communist Party
Members of the 17th Central Committee of the Chinese Communist Party
Delegates to the 11th National People's Congress
Commanders of the Chengdu Military Region
Sino-Vietnamese War